Alexander Mikhailovich Zuyev (July 17, 1961 – June 10, 2001) was a Soviet pilot who defected to the United States with his MiG-29 on May 20, 1989.

Defection
Zuyev was an interceptor pilot with the VVS Frontal Aviation Regiment based at Mikha Tskhakaya, Georgian SSR (present day Senaki, Georgia), Black Sea.  The day before his defection, he baked a large cake, having mixed a large amount of sleeping pills in the batter.  He then announced that his wife was pregnant with a boy (Dmitry Baglay), and invited the personnel in his regiment to celebrate.  During the party Zuyev handed each coworker a slice, except for four people: the commander who was preparing a flight plan, two mechanics on guard duty, and a unit member who was expected to be at another base.

When everyone was asleep, Zuyev cut the telephone lines, then approached the aircraft. The two sentries would not let him near the airplane. Zuyev returned and waited for some time past shift change time. The second shift was incapacitated, so one of the sentries went to the squadron. While he was gone, Zuyev approached the airplane and informed the mechanic on guard duty that his replacement would be late and that Zuyev would fill in.  This mechanic, already upset about his relief being late, was happy to hand Zuyev his assault rifle and walk away.

The other mechanic found everyone asleep at the squadron, and became suspicious of a problem. He returned to the airplane and confronted Zuyev.  Zuyev tried to disarm the mechanic, but failed, shot him with a pistol and wounded him. Zuyev was wounded in the right arm.

The aircraft were almost ready and Zuyev took off in one. After takeoff, he had planned to shoot other aircraft on the ground, but failed because he forgot to remove one of the two locks on the gun. The plane Zuyev had flown was one that had been in storage, and shreds of tarpaulin were still hanging from parts of the plane after it landed.

Aftermath
Turkish officials immediately agreed to a Soviet request to return the MiG-29, with a spokesman emphasising Ankara's wish to maintain good ties with the Soviet Union.  A Soviet plane with technicians and apparently another pilot had been expected the next day at Ankara, but it showed up later at Trabzon on the same day Zuyev arrived.  Controllers refused to grant landing permission.  The next afternoon, the Soviets were allowed to depart with the airplane, escorted out of Turkish airspace by Turkish Air Force jets.

Zuyev's first words at the Turkish airfield were: "Finally, I - an American!"  He underwent surgery for his wounds.  He was allowed to immigrate to the United States where he settled in San Diego, California, and opened a consulting firm. Zuyev wrote a book titled Fulcrum: A Top Gun Pilot's Escape from the Soviet Empire. Originally, Zuyev faced criminal charges such as hijacking in the Turkish courts, but the charges were dismissed for political reasons.

The seven who ate the cake at Gudauta were seriously incapacitated from the sleeping pills and all had to be hospitalised. However, they all recovered.

Aviation author Yefim Gordon in his 2007 book Mikoyan MiG-29 was sharply critical of Zuyev, referring to a prior suspension of Zuyev for poor discipline and that Zuyev's superiors were considering a dishonorable discharge. Gordon speculated that this is what spurred Zuyev into leaving the Soviet Union.

Life in the United States
On October 26, 1992, Aleksandr Zuyev’s second child was born (Michael J.D. Andersen) but Zuyev gave up parental rights almost immediately after his birth.

On January 3, 1993, Zuyev revealed that the reason that Korean Air Lines Flight 007 succeeded in crossing over Kamchatka without being intercepted was because Arctic gales had knocked out the Soviet radars on Kamchatka ten days previously, and the local officials had lied to Moscow that it was fixed. This prevented the Soviet Air Force from properly identifying the civilian aircraft before it was shot down.

Zuyev was debriefed by USMC Aviation Lieutenant Harry Spies.

According to Zuyev's biographical book "Fulcrum", Zuyev began working as a consultant for the CIA and Pentagon. Zuyev went on to assist the US detect the radars of the Mig29's during Operation Desert Storm.
 
On June 10, 2001, Zuyev died along with another aviator, Jerry "Mike" Warren, in a crash near Bellingham, Washington, when their Yakovlev Yak-52 entered and failed to recover from an accelerated stall.

Work
Fulcrum: A Top Gun Pilot's Escape from the Soviet Empire, by Alexander Zuyev, 1992,

See also

 Viktor Belenko
 List of Cold War pilot defections
 List of Eastern Bloc defectors

References

External links
 CBS 60 Minutes interview (aired January 3, 1993)

1961 births
2001 deaths
Soviet Air Force officers
Soviet defectors to the United States
Aviators killed in aviation accidents or incidents in the United States
Accidental deaths in Washington (state)